The Kockelscheuer Sport Centre (aka CK Sport Center, Kockelscheuer) is a tennis complex in Kockelscheuer, Luxembourg.

In April 1984, a men's tournament single edition was organized as part of the Grand Prix circuit. It was played indoors on carpet. Ivan Lendl won the singles event after defeating Tomáš Šmíd in the final (6–4, 6–4) while singles runner-up Tomáš Šmíd teamed-up with Anders Järryd to win the doubles event against Mark Edmondson and Sherwood Stewart (6–3, 7–5).

Currently, the complex is the host of the annual international stop, the BGL Luxembourg Open.

References

External links
 Groupe CK website
 

1991 establishments in Luxembourg
Sports venues completed in 1980
Indoor arenas in Luxembourg
Sport Centre
Tennis venues
Luxembourg Open